In human anatomy, the omental foramen (epiploic foramen, foramen of Winslow after the anatomist Jacob B. Winslow, or uncommonly aditus), is the passage of communication, or foramen, between the greater sac (general cavity (of the abdomen)), and the lesser sac.

Borders
It has the following borders:
 anterior: the free border of the lesser omentum, known as the hepatoduodenal ligament.  This has two layers and within these layers are the common bile duct, hepatic artery, and hepatic portal vein.
 posterior: the peritoneum covering the inferior vena cava
 superior: the peritoneum covering the caudate lobe of the liver
 inferior: the peritoneum covering the commencement of the duodenum and the hepatic artery, the latter passing forward below the foramen before ascending between the two layers of the lesser omentum.
 left lateral: gastrosplenic ligament and splenorenal ligament

As the portal vein is the most posterior structure in the hepatoduodenal ligament, and the inferior vena cava lies under the posterior wall, the epiploic foramen can be remembered as lying between the two great veins of the abdomen.

Additional images

See also
Terms for anatomical location
 Omental bursa (Lesser sac)
 Greater sac
 Lesser omentum
 Greater omentum
 Peritoneum

References

External links
 
  – "Abdominal Cavity: The Omental Foramen"
 
 
 
 
 

General surgery
Abdomen
Medical mnemonics